Videotext may refer to:
 Videotext, another name for Teletext, a broadcast (one-way) information service
 Videotex, an interactive (two-way) information service
 Living Videotext, a software development company founded by Dave W

de:Videotext